Mike Dmitrich (born 1936) is an American politician and Natural Resource Consultant from Utah. A Democrat, he served as a member of the Utah State Senate, representing the state's 27th senate district in Price. Dmitrich served as the Minority Leader in the Utah Senate. Prior to being elected to the Utah Senate Dmitrich served in the State House from 1969 to 1992.  He retired prior to the 2008 elections and was replaced by David P. Hinkins.

Dmitrich attended the College of Eastern Utah and Utah State University.

1936 births
Living people
Democratic Party members of the Utah House of Representatives
Utah State University alumni
Democratic Party Utah state senators
People from Murray, Utah
21st-century American politicians
People from Price, Utah